Ayb or AYB may refer to:

 Ayb (letter), a letter of the Armenian alphabet
 Ayb Educational Foundation, in Armenia
 Ayb School
 All your base are belong to us (sometimes abbreviated as AYB), an internet meme
 Anchor Yale Bible Series

See also 
 Eyb